The Liberty School was a one-room schoolhouse in Brentwood, Tennessee that was built in 1900.  Along with Forest Hills School and Liberty Hill School, it was one of the three best surviving examples in Williamson County of one room schoolhouses built during 1900–1920.  While most of these schools have been lost, they once provided the majority of public education in the county.

It was listed on the National Register of Historic Places in 1988, and was removed from the National Register in 2006.

The property was also known as Williamson County historic resource WM-1050.

References

Former National Register of Historic Places in Tennessee
Buildings and structures in Williamson County, Tennessee
School buildings completed in 1900
One-room schoolhouses in Tennessee
National Register of Historic Places in Williamson County, Tennessee
1900 establishments in Tennessee